The Progressive Social Party (PSP) was a populist, conservative political party in Brazil between 1946 and 1965, led by Adhemar de Barros.   The result of a merger between smaller parties, it was, in practice, the fourth largest party after the Social Democratic Party, the National Democratic Union and the Brazilian Labour Party in the 1947-1965 era. João Café Filho, the Vice President of Getúlio Vargas and later President after Vargas committed suicide. It was extremely strong in the State of São Paulo, under the leader of Adhemar de Barros, who held the office of Governor and Mayor of São Paulo during this period, besides being a candidate for president in 1960, winning over 20% of the vote. Like all parties of the 1947-1965 era, it was abolished by the military government.

In 1989, a new PSP was created by journalist "Marronzinho" which ran for president achieving a negligible vote. The son of Adhemar de Barros Filho then recreated the Progressive Republican Party which did not achieve the success of the old PSP.

Conservative parties in Brazil
Defunct political parties in Brazil
Political parties established in 1946
1946 establishments in Brazil
Political parties disestablished in 1966
1966 disestablishments in Brazil